Years Ago is the twenty-second studio album by American country music group The Statler Brothers. It was released in 1981 via Mercury Records. The album peaked at number 9 on the Billboard Top Country Albums chart.

Track listing
"Don't Wait on Me" (Don Reid, Harold Reid) – 3:16
"Today I Went Back" (D. Reid) – 2:08
"In the Garden" (C. Austin Miles) – 2:58
"Chet Atkins' Hand" (Lew DeWitt) – 3:31
"You'll Be Back (Every Night in My Dreams)" (Wayland Holyfield, Johnny Russell) – 2:39
"Years Ago" (D. Reid) – 2:22
"Love Was All We Had" (D. Reid) – 3:48
"We Ain't Even Started Yet" (D. Reid, H. Reid) – 2:27
"Dad" (D. Reid, H. Reid) – 2:47
"Memories Are Made of This" (Richard Dehr, Terry Gilkyson, Frank Miller) – 2:14

Chart performance

References

1981 albums
The Statler Brothers albums
Mercury Records albums
Albums produced by Jerry Kennedy